The Chevron B21 is a 2-liter Group 5 sports prototype race car, designed, developed and built by British manufacturer Chevron, in 1972. Over its racing career, spanning 13 years, it won a total of 23 races (as well as 15 additional class wins), scored 45 podium finishes, and clinched 11 pole positions. Only 28 cars were built.

References

Chevron racing cars
Sports prototypes
24 Hours of Le Mans race cars
Sports racing cars